Pakistan Forest Institute established in 1947, locate in Peshawar, Khyber Pakhtunkhwa, Pakistan.

Programs
 BS Forestry (4 years)
 M.Sc. Forestry

Journal
''Pakistan Journal of Forestry (PJF)

See also
Agricultural Training Institute, Peshawar

References

External links
Official Website

Agricultural universities and colleges in Pakistan
Educational institutions established in 1947
 
1947 establishments in Pakistan
Universities and colleges in Peshawar
Public universities and colleges in Khyber Pakhtunkhwa
Forest research institutes
Forestry education
Research institutes in Pakistan